William Barron may refer to:

William Augustus Barron, British landscape painter
William Barron (politician) (1837–1916), New Zealand Member of Parliament
William N. Barron (1859–1935), English-born lawyer and businessman in Missouri
Wally Barron (William Wallace Barron, 1911–2002), American politician in West Virginia
Bill Barron (1917–2006), English footballer and cricketer
Bill Barron (musician) (1927–1989), American jazz saxophonist

See also